The Iaşi I Power Station is a large thermal power plant located in Iaşi, having 4 generation groups, 2 of 50 MW each and 2 of 25 MW having a total electricity generation capacity of 150 MW.

References

Natural gas-fired power stations in Romania